John Beevor Prest (28 May 1826 – 15 August 1871) was an English first-class cricketer.

The son of John and Arabella Prest, he moved with them to Sheffield along his brother William when he bought a wine business. There he played first-class cricket for Sheffield (aka Yorkshire), making two appearances against Manchester in 1852 and 1854, with both matches played at Manchester. He scored 22 runs in his two matches, with a high score of 12. He died in Lincoln in August 1871.

References

External links

1826 births
1871 deaths
Cricketers from York
Wine merchants
English cricketers
Sheffield Cricket Club cricketers
19th-century English businesspeople